Fish Creek is a tributary of the Big Thompson River in Larimer County, Colorado.  The stream's source is Lily Lake in Roosevelt National Forest. It flows northeast to a confluence with the Big Thompson in Lake Estes.

See also
 List of rivers of Colorado

References

Rivers of Colorado
Rivers of Larimer County, Colorado
Tributaries of the Platte River